Thomas Charles Reginald Agar-Robartes (known as Tommy) (22 May 1880 – 30 September 1915) was a British Liberal politician.

Background and education
Tommy Agar-Robartes was the eldest son and heir of Thomas Agar-Robartes, 6th Viscount Clifden, and his wife Mary (née Dickenson) and was brought up at Lanhydrock House, Bodmin. He was the eldest of ten (including a twin sister). Educated at Oxford and a keen horseman, he played in the Oxford University polo team that beat Cambridge in 1903.

Public life
He was elected a Member of Parliament for Bodmin in the 1906 general election, but lost his seat in June 1906 following a controversial election petition by the defeated candidate  alleging illegal payments to potential voters. He was elected to the St Austell Division of Cornwall in a by-election in 1908 and held the seat until his death.

Military career
He was commissioned a second lieutenant in the Royal 1st Devon Imperial Yeomanry on 4 June 1902. At the outbreak of World War I he joined the Royal Bucks Hussars as an officer. Tommy then joined the Coldstream Guards and was subsequently posted to France & Flanders. Captain The Honourable Thomas Charles Reginald Agar-Robartes, in command of No. 2 Coy, 1st Bn, the Coldstream Guards, was wounded in the Battle of Loos on 28 September and killed by a sniper on 30 September 1915 after rescuing a wounded comrade under heavy fire for which he was recommended for the Victoria Cross.

Memorials
Agar-Robartes is buried in Lapugnoy Military Cemetery, near Béthune. He is commemorated by a memorial in Truro Cathedral and in stained glass at Selsey Abbey, Wimpole and Church Norton.

Agar-Robartes is commemorated on Panel 8 of the Parliamentary War Memorial in Westminster Hall, one of 22 MPs who died during World War I to be named on that memorial. Agar-Robartes is one of 19 MPs who fell in the war who are commemorated by heraldic shields in the Commons Chamber. A further act of commemoration came with the unveiling in 1932 of a manuscript-style illuminated book of remembrance for the House of Commons, which included a short biographical account of the life and death of Agar-Robartes. As Agar-Robartes never married and had no children, his younger brother Francis later succeeded their father in the viscountcy.

List of memorials

 Headstone at Lapugnoy Military Cemetery, near Béthune
 Wooden battlefield marker St Hydroc's Church, Lanhydrock, Cornwall
 Granite memorial seat at Truro Road, St Austell, Cornwall
 Stained glass window at St Hydroc Church, Lanhydrock, Cornwall
 Stained glass window at Selsey Abbey, Sussex
 Stained glass window at Wimpole, Cambridgeshire
Stained glass window at St Wilfrid's Chapel, Church Norton, West Sussex
 Marble bust at Truro Cathedral
 Wooden armorial shield at the House of Commons
 Brass plaque in Holy Trinity Church, St Austell

Notes

References

Wimpole War Memorial

External links
The Honourable Thomas Charles Reginald Robartes (1880-1915), MP by Richard Jack

1880 births
1915 deaths
Members of the Parliament of the United Kingdom for Bodmin
UK MPs 1910–1918
Coldstream Guards officers
British Army personnel of World War I
British military personnel killed in World War I
Politicians from Cornwall
People educated at Eton College
Alumni of Christ Church, Oxford
People from Lanhydrock
Liberal Party (UK) MPs for English constituencies
Royal Buckinghamshire Yeomanry officers
English twins
Thomas
Royal 1st Devon Yeomanry officers
Deaths by firearm in France
Heirs apparent who never acceded
Members of the Parliament of the United Kingdom for constituencies in Cornwall